Yogetor is a genus of East African jumping spiders that was first described by Wanda Wesołowska & A. Russell-Smith in 2000.  it contains two species, found in Ethiopia and Tanzania: Y. bellus and Y. spiralis.

References

Salticidae genera
Spiders of Africa
Taxa named by Wanda Wesołowska
Salticidae